Aurél Csertői (born 25 September 1965 in Győr) is a Hungarian football player and manager.

Coaching career

FC Fehérvár (Videoton FC) (2004-2006)
Csertői won a bronze medal in the Hungarian National Championship I 2005-06 season.

Haladás (2007-2009)
Csertői won a bronze medal in the Hungarian National Championship I 2008–09 season with the West Hungarian team, called Haladás Szombathely. As a consequence, his team could play in the Europa League 2009-10 season. In the first round Haladás Szombathely beat FC Irtysh Pavlodar 1–0 at home and they were defeated 2–1 away. In the second round Aurél Csertői's team played against the Swedish IF Elfsborg and they drew at home (0-0), but lost in Sweden 3-0 and they were eliminated from the Europa League 2009-10.

Győri ETO 
In 2011 Aurél Csertői was appointed as the manager of the Győri ETO FC.

References 

 

1965 births
Living people
Sportspeople from Győr
Hungarian footballers
Association football midfielders
Hungary international footballers
Szombathelyi Haladás footballers
Győri ETO FC players
MTK Budapest FC players
Budapest Honvéd FC players
Hungarian football managers
Győri ETO FC managers
BFC Siófok managers
Fehérvár FC managers
FC Sopron managers
Szombathelyi Haladás football managers
FC Tatabánya managers
Paksi FC managers
Nemzeti Bajnokság I managers